This article lists the squads for the 2017 Algarve Cup, the 24th edition of the Algarve Cup. The cup consisted of a series of friendly games, and was held in the Algarve region of Portugal from 1 to 8 March 2017. The twelve national teams involved in the tournament registered a squad of 23 players.

The age listed for each player is as of 1 March 2017, the first day of the tournament. The numbers of caps and goals listed for each player do not include any matches played after the start of tournament. The club listed is the club for which the player last played a competitive match prior to the tournament. The nationality for each club reflects the national association (not the league) to which the club is affiliated. A flag is included for coaches that are of a different nationality than their own national team.

Group A

Canada
Head coach:  John Herdman

The squad was announced on 21 February 2017.

Denmark
Head coach: Nils Nielsen

The squad was announced on 3 February 2017.

Portugal
Head coach: Francisco Neto

The squad was announced on 20 February 2017.

Russia
Head coach: Elena Fomina

Group B

Iceland
Head coach: Freyr Alexandersson

The squad was announced on 16 February 2017.

Japan
Head coach: Asako Takakura

The squad was announced on 9 February 2017.

Norway
Head coach:  Martin Sjögren

The squad was announced on 15 February 2017.

Spain
Head coach: Jorge Vilda

The squad was announced on 20 February 2017.

Group C

Australia
Head coach: Alen Stajcic

The squad was announced on 17 February 2017.

China
Head coach:  Bruno Bini

Netherlands
Head coach: Sarina Wiegman

Sweden
Head coach: Pia Sundhage

The squad was announced on 8 February 2017.

Player representation

By club
Clubs with 5 or more players represented are listed.

By club nationality

By club federation

By representatives of domestic league

References

2017 squads
squad